Jodeyne Higgins (born September 26, 1974) is a Canadian former competitive pair skater who also competed in the fours discipline. With Sean Rice, she is the 1995 Skate Canada International bronze medalist, the 1992 Nebelhorn Trophy bronze medalist, and a two-time (1993, 1995) Canadian national bronze medallist. She is also a four-time (1993–1996) Canadian fours champion.

Career 
Competing in pairs, Higgins and Rice won bronze at the 1992 Nebelhorn Trophy and at the 1993 Canadian Nationals. They were assigned to the 1993 World Championships where they placed 10th. The following season was less successful for the pair. They finished 6th at Nationals and were not sent to Worlds. After winning bronze at the 1995 Canadian Championships, they obtained a second trip to Worlds and finished 14th. The pair never reached the podium again at Nationals but they won bronze at the 1995 Skate Canada International.

Competing in fours at the Canadian Championships, Higgins and Rice won gold medals with Scott MacDonald and Alison Purkiss (1994–1996), and Jodi Barnes and Rob Williams (1993). They also won the 1992 bronze medal with Janice Yeck and Scott MacDonald and the 1997 silver medal with Melissa Shields and Trevor Buttenham.

Higgins and Rice retired from competitive skating and toured professionally on Royal Caribbean Cruise Lines, for whom Higgins works as the ice show director. In 2009, Higgins was a contestant on Battle of the Blades. She was paired with hockey player Ken Daneyko and was eliminated in week four. In 2011, Higgins appeared in series 6 of ITV's Dancing on Ice, with whom she reached the semi finals. She also performed with Dr. Johnson Beharry VC and husband Sean Rice on the 2011 Dancing On Ice Tour. In 2012, Higgins was partnered with Chico Slimani for series 7 after Chesney Hawkes injured himself in training before the start of the new series. Chico and Jodeyne finished 3rd in the Final of Dancing on Ice Series 7.

Personal life 
Higgins and Rice were married until his death in 2022. They have a daughter, Signey, born in October 2013.

Competitive highlights

Pairs with Rice

Fours with Rice and others

References

External links
 Jodeyne Higgins at Battle of the Blades

Canadian female pair skaters
Battle of the Blades participants
Place of birth missing (living people)
Sportspeople from Ontario
Sportspeople from Stratford, Ontario
Living people
1974 births